Luis Zárate (25 November 1940 – 7 September 2020) was a Mexican cyclist. He competed in the individual road race and team time trial events at the 1960 Summer Olympics.

References

External links
 

1940 births
2020 deaths
Mexican male cyclists
Olympic cyclists of Mexico
Cyclists at the 1960 Summer Olympics
Sportspeople from Morelia